5200 may refer to:

 Atari 5200 video game console
 Nokia 5200 mobile phone
 5200, a number in the 5000 (number) range
 A.D. 5200, the last year of the 52nd century CE
 5200 BC,a year in the 6th millennium BCE
 5200 Pamal, an asteroid in the Asteroid Belt, the 5200th asteroid registered

See also

 
 520 (disambiguation)